John Markland "Mark" Molson (28 April 1949 – 19 January 2006) was a Canadian professional bridge player from Montreal and Fenton, Michigan.

He was a member of the Molson family and attended Selwyn House School.

Most frequently partnered with Boris Baran, he won the Canada national bridge team Championships seven times, seven North American Bridge Championships, and came in second as a member of the Canada open  in the 1995 Bermuda Bowl.

On September 5, 1998, his daughter, Jennifer Rose Molson, was born. He married fellow bridge world champion Janice Seamon-Molson, Jennifer's mother, on March 16, 1999. Janice is still a highly ranked Bridge player and Jennifer attended the New York Film Academy for musical theatre. 

Molson died suddenly of complications during an operation for a dissected aortic aneurism. This medical issue first surfaced while Mark was playing golf.

He and Baran were inducted into the Canadian Bridge Federation Hall of Fame in 2013.

Bridge accomplishments

Awards
 Herman Trophy (1) 1989
 Richmond Trophy (5) 
 Canadian Bridge Federation Hall of Fame, 2013

Wins

 North American Bridge Championships (7)
 Blue Ribbon Pairs (1) 1989 
 Grand National Teams (1) 2002 
 Keohane North American Swiss Teams (4) 1992, 1994, 1995, 2002 
 Reisinger (1) 1989

Runners-up

 North American Bridge Championships
 Wernher Open Pairs (1) 1992 
 Keohane North American Swiss Teams (1) 1998 
 Reisinger (1) 1982 
 Spingold (1) 1982

References

External links
 
 Mark Molson Interview conducted by Audrey Grant (audio-video at YouTube)

1949 births
2006 deaths
Bermuda Bowl players
Canadian contract bridge players
Canadian people of English descent
People from Fenton, Michigan
Sportspeople from Montreal
Sportspeople from Metro Detroit